Sergio Amaury Ponce Villegas (born 13 August 1981) is a Mexican former professional footballer who played as a midfielder.

Career
He started his career on August 11 for Deportivo Toluca F.C. in 2001 playing against Monterrey, the game had ended in a draw. He played with Toluca from 2001 through 2008 raising 3 championships. The last time Toluca were crowned champions was in the game against Cruz Azul where Sergio scored a goal in the first length of the championship.

Sergio was part of the Mexican 2004 Olympic football team, who exited in the first round, having finished third in group A, below group winners Mali and South Korea.

C.D. Chivas De Guadalajara
Ponce signed with Club Deportivo Guadalajara on December 19, 2008, in exchange for Sergio Santana and Antonio Olvera, for a one-year loan.  He scored his first goal with Chivas on January 3, 2009, playing against America which ended in a 1–1 draw. Sergio later played the next 3 games with Guadalajara in the InterLiga. He scored in his Clausura debut with Guadalajara in a 3–3 draw against Cruz Azul and he scored the winning goal in the Superclasico against America by heading the ball into Guillermo Ochoa's gap into the back of the net, on April 19, 2009.

Tigres UANL
On December 22, 2009, Sergio Amaury Ponce joined Tigres on a loan from Guadalajara for the Torneo Bicentenario 2010.

Coras de Tepic
He was loaned to Coras de Tepic for the 2015 Ascenso MX season.

International appearances
As of 4 June 2008

Scores and results list Mexico's goal tally first.

Honours
Mexico U23
CONCACAF Olympic Qualifying Championship: 2004

References

External links
 
 
 
 
 Ponce Leaves Chivas for Tirgres

1981 births
Living people
Sportspeople from Tepic, Nayarit
Footballers from Nayarit
Deportivo Toluca F.C. players
C.D. Guadalajara footballers
Tigres UANL footballers
San Luis F.C. players
Querétaro F.C. footballers
Atlas F.C. footballers
Liga MX players
Olympic footballers of Mexico
Footballers at the 2004 Summer Olympics
Association football midfielders
Mexican footballers
Mexico international footballers